Ali Gençay (2 February 1905 – 28 March 1957) was a Turkish footballer. He competed in the men's tournament at the 1924 Summer Olympics.

References

External links
 

1905 births
1957 deaths
Turkish footballers
Turkey international footballers
Olympic footballers of Turkey
Footballers at the 1924 Summer Olympics
Footballers from Istanbul
Association football defenders
Galatasaray S.K. footballers